"Trying to Be Cool" is a song by the French band Phoenix from their fifth album Bankrupt!. It was released as the second single from the album on 8 July 2013. The official remix features R. Kelly. The song became Phoenix's third top-ten hit on the Billboard Alternative Songs chart, after "1901" and "Lisztomania". The song's cover includes a mint julep, which is said in one of the song's lines, "mint julep testosterone". Frontman Thomas Mars told Spin magazine the lyrics to "Trying to Be Cool" mainly analyse "the beauty of the fake".

Music video
The single's music video, which was directed by Canada and produced by The Creators Project, was released on YouTube on 2 July 2013. The music video includes a "surprise" made every 20 seconds.  

The version of the song used in the music video is more guitar-driven and less synthesizer-driven than the album version. In addition, the video version is a medley with "Drakkar Noir". This combination has become the typical live-performance of the song for Phoenix's concerts.

Charts

Weekly charts

Year-end charts

References

Phoenix (band) songs
2013 singles
V2 Records singles
2013 songs
Songs written by Thomas Mars
Songs written by Laurent Brancowitz